This is a list of United States attorneys appointed by the 45th president of the United States, Donald Trump.

President Trump nominated 86 people to be U.S. attorneys, and 84 of them were confirmed. There are a total of 93 U.S. attorneys in the Department of Justice.

Trump's U.S. attorneys have been overwhelmingly white and male. During Trump's term, just seven U.S. attorneys named were women, including acting attorneys, and just one of his first 42 appointments was a woman. Only seven of 93 were people of color.

List of United States attorneys
 Denotes interim appointee.

References

External links 
 U.S. Attorneys Office

2010s politics-related lists
Lists of American politicians
 United States Attorneys
Donald Trump-related lists
Presidency of Donald Trump
Donald Trump controversies
Trump administration controversies